Issachar Jacox Roberts (Chinese: 罗孝全 Luó Xiàoquán)  (1802–1871) was a Southern Baptist missionary in Qing China notable for being in direct contact with Hong Xiuquan and for denying him Christian baptism.

Early life
Roberts was born in Sumner County, Tennessee, and graduated from Furman University, a Baptist school in Greenville, South Carolina.

Significance
He was known for his erratic behaviour and "falling into difficulties with nearly everyone who worked with him", which cost him his connection with the Southern Baptist Convention. Roberts was the only Baptist known to have influenced Hong Xiuquan (洪秀全, Wade-Giles: Hung Hsiu-ch'üan), the Hakka who led the Taiping Rebellion (1851–1864) against the Qing Dynasty which caused millions of deaths. Hong spent two months studying with Roberts at Canton (Guangzhou) in 1847. Roberts refused Hong's request for baptism, perhaps due to a misunderstanding.

He was also the first Baptist missionary arrived in Hong Kong in February 1842.

With the Taipings
In 1860, Roberts left Canton for the Taiping capital at Nanjing. He was dismayed to find that the beliefs of the Taiping departed widely from his own Christianity, but nevertheless accepted a post as advisor to Hong Rengan, foreign minister at the Taiping court. While there, Roberts arranged for some Baptists from the United States to visit Nanjing and meet Hong directly. He left in January 1862 on board the British gunboat Renard following a dispute with Hong, accusing Hong of the murder of Issachar's servant,  and was thereafter fiercely critical of the Taiping.

Death
Roberts died of leprosy (which he had contracted in Macao in 1837) at the home of his niece in Upper Alton, Madison County, Illinois on December 28, 1871.

References

Bibliography
American Baptist Foreign Missionary Society Archives, Valley Forge, Pennsylvania, Issachar J. Roberts papers and correspondence
Boardman, Eugene Powers, Christian Influence on the Ideology of the Taiping Rebellion, 1952
Coughlin, Margaret Morgan, "Strangers in the House: J. Lewis Shuck and Issachar Roberts, First American Baptist Missionaries in China, Ph.D. dissertation, University of Virginia, 1972
Pruden, George Blackburn Jr., "Issachar Jacox Roberts and American Diplomacy in China."  Ph.D. dissertation, American University, 1977
Rapp, John A., "Clashing Dilemmas: Hong Rengan, Issachar Roberts, and a Taiping "Murder" Mystery," Journal of Historical Biography 4 (Autumn 2008)
Teng, Yuan Chung, "Reverend Issachar Jacox Roberts and the Taiping Rebellion," Journal of Asian Studies, 23, no. 1, (1963) 55–67. Available via JSTOR.
Zetzsche, Jost: «Gützlaffs Bedeutung für die protestantischen Bibelübersetzungen ins Chinesische», i Karl Gützlaff (1803-1851) und das Christentum in Ostasien, s. 155–171, red. av Thoralf Klein, Reinhard Zöllner. Collectana Serica. Nettetal: Monumenta Serica, 2005 
For a fictionalized account of Robert's activities in Nanking during the Taiping years see Tienkuo: The Heavenly Kingdom by "Li Bo" (Steven Leibo)

1802 births
1871 deaths
19th-century American people
19th-century Baptists
Baptist missionaries from the United States
Baptist missionaries in China
Furman University alumni
People from Madison County, Illinois
People from Sumner County, Tennessee
People of the Taiping Rebellion
American expatriates in China
Baptists from Tennessee
Deaths from leprosy